Pingtung County is a county located in southern Taiwan. It has a warm tropical monsoon climate and is known for its agriculture and tourism. Kenting National Park, Taiwan's oldest national park, is located in the county. The county seat is Pingtung City.

Name
The name Pingtung means "east of Banping mountain", referring to a nearby mountain known as Banping mountain.

History

Early history
Aboriginal inhabitants of Liuqiu Island (13 km [8 mi] southwest of Taiwan, and now part of Pingtung County) killed Dutch sailors on two occasions. In response, in the spring of 1636, Dutch sailors carried out a punitive campaign that became known as the Lamey Island Massacre.

Modern-day Pingtung County and Kaohsiung City were part of Banlian-chiu (萬年州; Bān-liân-chiu) during the Kingdom of Tungning (1661–1683) and Fongshan Prefecture (鳳山縣; Hōng-soaⁿ-koān) during Qing dynasty rule (1683–1895).

Until the seventeenth century, this area of Taiwan was a place of exile for Chinese criminals and the occasional landing point for international mariners. Only the settlements near present-day Checheng Township existed. In 1664, the Hakka settlers arrived from mainland China and farmed under a homesteading system introduced by Zheng Jing.

Pingtung City, the biggest city in Pingtung County, also known as "A-Kau" (阿猴; A-kâu, English: the forest), was the home of Taiwanese Plains Aborigines.

In 1684, settlers from China's southern Fujian region created the first Han Chinese villages near Pingtung. By 1734, most of the Pingtung Plain was cultivated, and Pingtung was expanded in 1764. In 1836, the government and locals worked together to build the city's four walls (the North Gate, the East Gate, the West Gate, and the South gate), and the roads were completed.

In March 1867, fourteen American sailors were killed near Kenting by local aborigines in the Rover incident, which lead to the failed American Formosa Expedition three months later. In 1871, local aborigines killed 54 sailors from Ryukyu in the Mudan Incident. The Japanese carried out a punitive campaign against the local aborigines in the 1874 Japanese invasion of Taiwan.

Empire of Japan

In 1901, ;  was established.

Republic of China
Following the handover of Taiwan from Japan to the Republic of China on 25 October 1945, the area of present-day Pingtung County was incorporated into Kaohsiung County on 25 December 1945. On 16 August 1950, Pingtung County was established after being separated from Kaohsiung County. a On 1 December 1951, Pingtung City was downgraded from provincial city to county-administered city and made the county seat of Pingtung County.

Pingtung was the site of a 7.1 magnitude earthquake on 26 December 2006.

Geography
Geographically, it borders Kaohsiung City to the north, Taitung County to the east, the Taiwan Strait to the west and the Bashi Channel to the south. Islands administered by the county include Hsiao Liuchiu (Lamay Islet; 琉球嶼) and Qixingyan (Seven Star Reefs).

Climate
Located in the southernmost part of Taiwan, Pingtung County is known for one of the warmest climates within the country. It has a tropical monsoon climate bordering on a tropical wet and dry climate (Köppen climate classifications: Am bordering on Aw). The climate differs across the large county due to its varying geography.

Northern Pingtung, where Pingtung City is located, is characterized by high daytime temperatures year-round with average daytime highs of 30–40 °C (86–104 °F) from April to November, and 25–28 °C (77–82 °F) from December to March. The lowest nighttime temperatures are around 16 °C (61 °F), due to distance from the sea.

Central Pingtung, such as the coastal Fangliao Township, has a lower daytime temperatures and warmer nights due to the regulating effect of the ocean, which is especially noticeable during winter.

The mildest climate of Pingtung is at its southern tip, the Hengchun Peninsula, which is nearly surrounded by the Pacific Ocean. Daily highs reach 29–32 °C (84–90 °F) during summer and 23–26 °C (73–79 °F) during winter. Nighttime temperatures remain warm throughout the year with lows of around 25 °C (77 °F) during summer and 19 °C (66 °F) during the winter.

Government

Administrative divisions

Pingtung County is divided into 1 city, 3 urban townships, 21 rural townships, and 8 indigenous mountain townships. Pingtung County has the largest number of rural townships and mountain indigenous townships among the counties of Taiwan.

Colors indicate the statutory language status of Hakka and Formosan languages in the respective subdivisions.

Politics
Pingtung City is the county seat of Pingtung County which houses the Pingtung County Government and Pingtung County Council. The county head is Magistrate Pan Men-an of the Democratic Progressive Party. Pingtung County elected three Democratic Progressive Party legislators to the Legislative Yuan during the 2016 legislative election.

Demographics

Pingtung is home to the indigenous Rukai and Paiwan tribes, which makes up 7% of the population.  the total population of Pingtung County was 798,940. The county has been experiencing population decline for 15 consecutive years due to emigration to other cities.

Religion
 Pingtung County had 1,101 registered temples, the third highest amongst Taiwan's counties after Tainan and Kaohsiung.
Donglong Temple and Checheng Fu'an Temple are some of the most prominent temples in the county. Indigenous tribes like Makatao people also have their own places of worship like Jiaruipu Temple.

Economy
The agriculture and fishing industries dominate the county's economy. In recent years, the county has also promoted the tourism sector, which constituted 30% of Taiwan's tourism industry in 2015.

In February 2014, the county government announced a plan to develop an industrial center that consists of a service center, workshop, and performance venue. The aim is to promote the development of industries that leverage the unique cultural attributes of the Linali tribe. On 22 September 2015, the National Development Council revealed a three-year large-scale development plan to boost the economy of the county by transforming Dapeng Bay, Donggang Township, and Lamay Island into a fishery, recreational, and tourism hub.

Education

Universities and colleges
 Meiho University
 National Pingtung University (amalgamation of National Pingtung University of Education and National Pingtung Institute of Commerce)
 National Pingtung University of Science and Technology
 Tajen University
 Tzu Hui Institute of Technology

High schools
 Pingtung Senior High School
 Pingtung Girl's Senior High School
 Da-Tong Senior High School
 Chao-Chou Senior High School

Energy
Pingtung County houses Taiwan's third nuclear power plant, the Maanshan Nuclear Power Plant. The power plant is located in Hengchun Township. It is Taiwan's second-largest nuclear power plant in terms of its capacity at

Transportation

Rail

The Pingtung Line and South-Link Line of the Taiwan Railways Administration cross Pingtung County. These lines service Central Signal, Chaozhou, Donghai, Fangliao, Fangshan, Fangye Signal, Guilai, Jiadong, Jialu, Kanding, Linbian, Linluo, Liukuaicuo, Nanzhou, Neishi, Pingtung, Xishi, Zhen'an and Zhutian Station. The Pingtung Line links Pingtung County with Kaohsiung City, while the South-Link Line links Pingtung County with Taitung County.

Ferries
Ferry service operates between Donggang Township and Baisha Port and Dafu Port on the offshore Lamay Island.

Tourist attractions 

 Ahou City Gate
 Black Dwarf Cave
 Black Pearl – Top Quality Wax Apple
 Checheng Fuan Temple
 Chaolin Temple
 Danlin Suspension Bridge
 Donglong Temple
 Eluanbi Lighthouse
 Fangliao F3 Art Venue
 Fangshan Post Office
 Hengchun Chuhuo Natural Fire
 Indigenous Culture Hall
 Jialeshuei
 Jiaruipu Temple
 Jiuru Sanshan Guowang Temple
 Kaoping Iron Railway Bridge
 Kaoping Riverfront Park
 Kapok Trees
 Kenting National Park
 Kentington Resort
 Kuan Hai Shan Academy
 Landscape of Manjhou
 Linben Riverfront Park
 Linhousilin Forest Park
 Liudui Hakka Cultural Park
 Loacijia Slate Houses
 Longkeng Conservation Area
 Longluan Lake
 Longpan Park
 Mobitou
 Mudan Dam
 Museum of Traditional Theater
 National Museum of Marine Biology and Aquarium
 Old House of Siiao Family
 Penbay International Circuit
 Pingtung Art Museum
 Pingtung Hakka Cultural Museum
 Shuangliu Forest Recreation Area
 Sinpi Jian-gong Water Park
 South Bay
 Taipower Exhibit Center in Southern Taiwan
 Taiwan Indigenous Peoples Cultural Park
 Tongkang Mosque
 Wanchin Church
 Yang Family Ancestral Hall
 Zhong-Sheng-Gong Memorial

See also
 List of county magistrates of Pingtung
 List of Taiwanese superlatives

Notes

References

External links

Pingtung County Government
i-Pingtung - Tourist Service